Alisa Rukpinij ( born 2 February 1995) is a Thai international footballer who plays as a forward.

International goals

References

External links 
 
 

1995 births
Living people
Women's association football forwards
Alisa Rukpinij
Alisa Rukpinij
Alisa Rukpinij
Southeast Asian Games medalists in football
Footballers at the 2018 Asian Games
Competitors at the 2017 Southeast Asian Games
Alisa Rukpinij
2015 FIFA Women's World Cup players
Alisa Rukpinij
Alisa Rukpinij